"Flaming Star" is a song first recorded by Elvis Presley as part of the soundtrack for his 1960 motion picture Flaming Star.

It was also in February 1961 released as the first track of an extended play titled Elvis by Request: Flaming Star and 3 Other Great Songs.

The song peaked at number 14 on the Billboard Hot 100.

Writing and recording 
The song was written by Sid Wayne and Sherman Edwards. Elvis Presley recorded it on October 7, 1960, in the Radio Recorders Studio in Hollywood, California. An alternate song entitled Black Star - with a similar theme to the Blackstar song that opens David Bowie's 2016 Blackstar album - was also recorded for the movie but was not used.

Charts

References 

Film theme songs
1960 songs
Elvis Presley songs
Songs written by Sherman Edwards
Songs written by Sid Wayne
Songs written for films